John Douglas Arnup,  (May 24, 1911 – October 5, 2005) was a Canadian judge on the Court of Appeal for Ontario, who is best known for having pioneered universal legal aid in Ontario.

Early life and education
Born in Toronto, Ontario, the son of Jesse H. Arnup (1881–1965), a Methodist minister who was Moderator of the United Church of Canada from 1945 to 1946, and Ella Maud Leeson (1883–1966).
He attended Oakwood Collegiate Institute in Toronto, and then received a Bachelor of Arts degree from Victoria College in the University of Toronto in 1932. He received a Bachelor of Laws degree from Osgoode Hall Law School in 1935. He was called to the Ontario bar in 1935.

Career 
Arnup was named a King's Counsel in 1950 and practiced law with Mason, Foulds, Davidson, Carter & Kellock (now WeirFoulds LLP). He became one of the leading litigators in Ontario courts, and was named a King's Counsel in 1950.  In 1968 he won a notable victory over another noted litigator, John Robinette, in the four-year-long Texas Gulf Sulphur case, at the time the longest civil trial in Canadian legal history. Bertha Wilson, later a judge of the Supreme Court of Canada, described it as "Ontario's two most outstanding counsel facing off against each other under the keen and critical eye of its most outstanding judge," George "Bill" Gale.

In 1949 Arnup played a role in the reorganization of legal education in Ontario in 1949, and he was a bencher (board member) of the Law Society of Upper Canada from 1951 to 1970. As treasurer (president) of the law society 1964-66, he guided the development of Ontario's first program of paid legal aid and facilitated the move of Osgoode Hall Law School from the Law Society to York University.

In 1970 Justice Gale, by then Chief Justice of Ontario, was seeking to strengthen the Court of Appeal for Ontario by recruiting top advocates, beginning with Arnup. "If I can get you, I can get anybody," Gale told Arnup, and Arnup accepted the appointment. Until his retirement in 1985, he was part of what grew into one of Canada's most respected appellate courts.

In 1988, his book Middleton: The Beloved Judge, a biography of former justice of the Supreme Court of Ontario William Middleton, was published.

In 1989, he was made an Officer of the Order of Canada "for his contributions to his Church, to legal education in the Province of Ontario and for his work in the development of Osgoode Hall Law School".

Death 

Arnup died on October 5, 2005, In Toronto Canada. He had a illness since October 1. He was 94.

References
 
 
 

1911 births
2005 deaths
Lawyers in Ontario
Judges in Ontario
Officers of the Order of Canada
People from Toronto
Members of the United Church of Canada
Treasurers of the Law Society of Upper Canada
University of Toronto alumni
Osgoode Hall Law School alumni
Canadian King's Counsel